Clatterbridge is a hamlet on the Wirral Peninsula, in the Metropolitan Borough of Wirral, Merseyside, England. It is to the south-west of Bebington and close to the M53 motorway. Clatterbridge is also the name of a local government ward, which includes Brimstage, Raby, Raby Mere, Thornton Hough, Storeton, Spital and the western fringes of Bromborough and Eastham.

At the 2001 census, the total population of the ward was 16,906, falling to 14,411 at the 2011 census. The hamlet of Clatterbridge only had a recorded resident population of 30 in 2001.

Geography

The Clatter Brook merges into the River Dibbin at Raby Mere, before discharging into the River Mersey at Bromborough.

Economy
The major employment sector in Clatterbridge is healthcare. The area is the site of Clatterbridge Health Park, which hosts Clatterbridge Hospital, Clatterbridge Cancer Centre and Radio Clatterbridge.

Transport

Road
Clatterbridge is located close to junction 4 of the M53 motorway, which joins with the A5137. The B5151 passes across the Clatter Bridge.

Rail
This station is on the Wirral line of the Merseyrail network, with frequent services to Liverpool, Chester and Ellesmere Port.

Bus
Buses operating in Clatterbridge as of August 2020:

References

External links

Clatterbridge Cancer Centre

Hamlets in Merseyside
Towns and villages in the Metropolitan Borough of Wirral